Jeffrey Dalmat (born April 23, 1991 in La Trinite, Martinique) is a French basketball player who plays for French Pro A league club Poitiers.

References

French men's basketball players
French people of Martiniquais descent
1991 births
Living people